Ángel Vallejo Domínguez (born 1 April 1981 in Mijares) is a Spanish former cyclist, who competed in the Vuelta a España in 2006 and 2007.

Major results
2006
1st Stage 10 Tour de Langkawi

References

External links

1981 births
Living people
Spanish male cyclists
Sportspeople from the Province of Ávila
Cyclists from Castile and León